George Odom may refer to:

George M. Odom (1882–1964), American jockey and horse trainer
George T. Odom (1950–2016), American film and television actor
George Phillips Odom Jr. (1941–2010), American artist and amateur geometer